Nelan is a surname. Notable people with the surname include:

Charles Nelan (1859–1904), American artist and political cartoonist
James Nelan, guitarist for Canadian rock band The Reason

See also
Neelan
Nela (name)
Nolan (surname)